Meydanak or Maidanak may refer to:

Meydanak, Alborz
Meydanak, Fars
Meydanak-e Bozorg, Isfahan Province
Meydanak-e Kuchak, Isfahan Province
Meydanak, Lorestan
Meydanak, Markazi
Meydanak, Mazandaran
Maidanak, Uzbekistan
Maidanak Observatory, Uzbekistan
Maidanak space tracking centre, Uzbekistan

See also
Majdanek, Nazi concentration camp